Ust-Donetsky District is an administrative and municipal district (raion), one of the forty-three in Rostov Oblast, Russia. It is located in the center of the oblast. Its administrative center is the urban locality (a work settlement) of Ust-Donetsky. Population: 33,647 (2010 Census);  The population of the administrative center accounts for 35.1% of the district's total population.

See also
 Church of the Nativity (Nizhnekundryuchenskaya)

References

Notes

Sources

Districts of Rostov Oblast